Watermans may refer to:

 Watermans Arts Centre, arts centre in London
 Watermans Bay, Western Australia, suburb of Perth

See also
 Waterman (disambiguation)